The following lists events that happened during 1972 in New Zealand.

Population
 Estimated population as of 31 December: 2,959,700
 Increase since 31 December 1971: 61,200 (2.11%)
 Males per 100 females: 99.7

Incumbents

Regal and viceregal
Head of State – Elizabeth II
Governor-General – Sir Arthur Porritt Bt GCMG GCVO CBE, followed by Sir Denis Blundell GCMG GCVO KBE QSO.

Government
The 36th Parliament of New Zealand concluded.  A general election was held on 8 December and saw the second National government defeated by a large margin, with the Labour Party winning 55 of 87 seats in Parliament.
Speaker of the House – Roy Jack until 8 December, then Alfred Allen.
Prime Minister – Keith Holyoake then Jack Marshall then Norman Kirk
Deputy Prime Minister – Jack Marshall then Robert Muldoon then Hugh Watt.
Minister of Finance – Robert Muldoon then Bill Rowling.
Minister of Foreign Affairs – Keith Holyoake then Jack Marshall then Norman Kirk.
Attorney-General – Dan Riddiford until 9 February, then Roy Jack until 8 December, then Martyn Finlay.
Chief Justice — Sir Richard Wild

Parliamentary opposition 
 Leader of the Opposition –   Norman Kirk (Labour) until 8 December, then Jack Marshall (National).

Main centre leaders
Mayor of Auckland – Dove-Myer Robinson
Mayor of Hamilton – Mike Minogue
Mayor of Wellington – Frank Kitts
Mayor of Christchurch – Neville Pickering
Mayor of Dunedin – Jim Barnes

Events 

 14 September - As a part of the Māori protest movement, activist group Ngā Tamatoa, the Te Reo Māori Society of Victoria University, and Te Huinga Rangatahi (the New Zealand Māori Students’ Association) presented a petition signed by over 33,000 people calling for te Reo Māori to be taught in schools, leading to the creation of te Wiki o te Reo Māori (Māori Language Week) in 1975, and a revitalisation of Māori language.
 20 October – Restrictions on the manufacture and sale of margarine in New Zealand are removed.
 3 December – Qantas commences the first Boeing 747 service in New Zealand, between Christchurch and Sydney.
 Chile and New Zealand establish embassies in each other's capitals.
 The Values Party is formed.

Arts and literature
Ian Wedde wins the Robert Burns Fellowship.

See 1972 in art, 1972 in literature

Music

New Zealand Music Awards
Loxene Golden Disc  Suzanne – Sunshine Through A Prism
Loxene Golden Disc  Creation – Carolina

See: 1972 in music

Performing arts

 Benny Award presented by the Variety Artists Club of New Zealand to Jon Zealando and Lou Clauson QSM.

Radio and Television
The Broadcasting Authority in March grants the right to broadcast a second television channel to the private consortium Independent Television Corporation. After the election of the Labour Government in November, Norman Kirk announces the second channel will be run by NZBC.
In September, the first live broadcast of an All Black match takes place. The All Blacks played against Australia. 
Feltex Television Awards:
Best Programme: Charlie's Rock – Pukemanu
Outstanding Performance: Peter Sinclair in Golden Disc Award
Best Drama: Charlie's Rock – Pukemanu

See: 1972 in New Zealand television, 1972 in television, List of TVNZ television programming, Public broadcasting in New Zealand

Film
To Love a Māori

See: 1972 in film, List of New Zealand feature films, Cinema of New Zealand

Sport

Athletics
 Field events within New Zealand switch from imperial to metric measurements. Track events changed earlier in 1969.
 David McKenzie wins his fourth and last national title in the men's marathon, clocking 2:14:11.2 on 11 March in Dunedin.

Chess
 The 79th National Chess Championship is held in Hamilton, and is won by R.J. Sutton of Auckland (his third title).

Horse racing

Harness racing
 New Zealand Trotting Cup: Globe Bay
 Auckland Trotting Cup: Royal Ascot

Olympic Games

Summer Olympics

 New Zealand sends a team of 89 competitors.

Winter Olympics

 New Zealand sends a team of two alpine skiers.

Paralympic Games

Summer Paralympics

 New Zealand sends a team of 10 competitors.

Soccer
 New Zealand National Soccer League won by Mt. Wellington AFC
 The Chatham Cup is won by Christchurch United who met Mount Wellington.
Final 4-4 after extra time
First replay 1-1 after extra time
Second replay 2-1

Births
 3 January: Shaun Longstaff, rugby player
 9 January: Gary Stead, cricketer
 3 March: Peter O'Leary, soccer referee
 27 March: David Bain, originally served 12 years for murder of his family, conviction quashed by Privy Council and subsequently found not guilty at retrial.
 29 March: Paul Kent, swimmer
 12 April: Jenny Shepherd, field hockey player
 17 April: Dylan Mika, All Black (died 20 March 2018)
 16 May: Matthew Hart, cricketer
 3 June: Robert Kennedy, cricketer
 7 June: Karl Urban, actor
 11 June: Stephen Kearney, rugby league player and coach 
 21 June (in South Africa): Irene van Dyk, netball player
 3 July: Aleksei Kulashko, chess player
 4 July: Craig Spearman, cricketer
 12 August: Tony Marsh, rugby player
 6 October: Brooke Howard-Smith, broadcaster.
 27 October: John Steel, swimmer
 16 December: Angela Bloomfield,  actress
 18 December: Julian Arahanga, actor 
20 December: Jonathan Wyatt, long-distance runner
 Veeshayne Armstrong, television presenter.
 (in Britain): Warwick Murray, academic.
 (in Hong Kong): Jack Yan, publisher, designer and businessman

Deaths

March
 2 March – Billy Wallace, rugby player and All Black (born 1878)
 4 March – Major-General Sir Harold Barrowclough, former chief justice (born 1894)

April
 14 April – Bert Hawthorne, motor racing driver (born 1943)

July 
 10 July – Charles Bowden, politician (born 1886)

August 
 8 August – Agnes Weston, politician (MLC) (born 1879)

September
 8 September – Harold Temple White, music teacher, conductor, organist and composer (born 1881)

October 
 5 October – Jim Barclay, politician (born 1882)
 8 October – Laurie Brownlie, rugby player and All Black (born 1899)
 20 October – John Pascoe, photographer and mountaineer (born 1908)
 22 October – James K. Baxter, poet (born 1926)

December 
 11 December – John Mills, cricketer (born 1905)
 26 December – Ronald Hugh Morrieson, writer (born 1922)

References

See also
 1972 in science
 1972 in Australia
 History of New Zealand
 Military history of New Zealand
 Timeline of the New Zealand environment
 Timeline of New Zealand history
 Timeline of New Zealand's links with Antarctica

 
New Zealand
Years of the 20th century in New Zealand